J.P. Instruments is an American aircraft avionics manufacturer.

The company was founded in Santa Ana, California marketing its first product, "The Scanner", to monitor engine temperatures in piston engine aircraft. In 1992, JPI came out with the EDM-500 which electronically monitors and stores engine parameters.

References

External links
 

Avionics companies
Companies based in Costa Mesa, California